Judge Estes may refer to:

Joe Ewing Estes (1903–1989), judge of the United States District Court for the Northern District of Texas
William Lee Estes (1870–1930), judge of the United States District Court for the Eastern District of Texas